Buena Vista is a historic home located at New Castle, New Castle County, Delaware. It was built between 1845 and 1847, and is a two-story, five bay, brick dwelling in the Greek Revival style. It has a service wing and a long wing designed by architect R. Brognard Okie containing a long hall and library. It features a full width verandah supported by Doric order columns.  It was the home of U.S. Senator and Secretary of State John M. Clayton (1796-1856) and U.S. Senator and Delaware Governor C. Douglass Buck (1890-1965), who donated it to the State of Delaware.  It is operated as the Buena Vista Conference Center by the State of Delaware.

The estate originally was named in commemoration of the Battle of Buena Vista in the Mexican–American War. It was added to the National Register of Historic Places in 1971.

References

External links
Buena Vista: A Brief History

Historic American Buildings Survey in Delaware
Houses on the National Register of Historic Places in Delaware
Greek Revival architecture in Delaware
Houses completed in 1847
Houses in New Castle, Delaware
1847 establishments in Delaware
National Register of Historic Places in New Castle County, Delaware